7E or 7-E can refer to:

7th meridian east
A-7E, a model of  LTV A-7 Corsair II
South African Class 7E, a locomotive
7E, a Long Island bus; see List of bus routes in Suffolk County, New York
MD 7E, a section of Maryland Route 7
Windows 7 E, one of the Windows 7 editions
AIM-7E Sparrow, a model of AIM-7 Sparrow
Nebraska Link 7E; see List of Nebraska Connecting Link, Spur, and Recreation Highways
SSH 7E (WA), now called Washington State Route 171
General Electric 7E; see  General Electric YJ93
7e, meaning 7th in French
Paris 7e (or 7e arrondissement), the 7th arrondissement of Paris
EOS Elan 7/7e; see Canon EOS 30
7E, the production code for the 1987 Doctor Who serial Paradise Towers
7-Eleven, an international chain of convenience stores

See also
E7 (disambiguation)